Samuel Simons (1792 – January 13, 1847) was a Democratic member of the United States House of Representatives from Connecticut's 4th congressional district from 1843 to 1845. He was a member of the Connecticut House of Representatives in 1830.

Early life 
He was born in Bridgeport, Connecticut, where he pursued an academic course of study. He held several local offices and also taught in school. He studied medicine and commenced practice in Bridgeport, Connecticut.

Political career 
Simons was a member of the Connecticut House of Representatives in 1830. In addition, he was the director of the Housatonic Railroad and a trustee of the Bridgeport Savings Bank. He served in the Twenty-eighth Congress from March 4, 1843, to March 3, 1845, and served as chairman of the Committee on Engraving. After leaving Congress, he resumed the practice of medicine in Bridgeport, Connecticut, where he died in 1847. He was buried in Mountain Grove Cemetery.

References

External links

 

1792 births
1847 deaths
Burials at Mountain Grove Cemetery, Bridgeport
Democratic Party members of the Connecticut House of Representatives
Politicians from Bridgeport, Connecticut
Democratic Party members of the United States House of Representatives from Connecticut
19th-century American politicians